Thomas Town of Town Place in Throwley, Kent, was an English politician.

Family
Town was the son and heir of Thomas atte Town, who died in 1403, by Bennet Detling, daughter and heiress of John Detling of Detling, Kent, who was also known as John Brampton. Thomas Town married Joan Cheyne, daughter of William Cheyne of Eastchurch, Isle of Sheppey, Kent. They had three daughters.

Career
Town was a Member of Parliament for Kent constituency in 1420.

References

Year of birth missing
Year of death missing
English MPs 1420
15th-century deaths
People from the Borough of Swale